Pournamithinkal was an Indian Malayalam-language television soap opera drama. The show  premiered on Asianet channel and streaming on Disney+ Hotstar. It was produced by Chitra Shenoy's  Good Company Productions. 
Chitra Shenoy, Gauri Krishnan, and Vishnu Nair play the lead roles and veteran actor Sai Kumar made his comeback to the mini screen after 14 years. The show went off air on 17 April 2021 due to poor ratings.

Synopsis

Season-1
Raghunandan and Rajalakshmi were lovers years back, but never married. They separated and married others. 25 years later they meet again. Both of them are leading their families. Raghundandan is a cancer patient and a father of Pournami. Rajalakshmi is married to Prathap Shankar, a wealthy businessman. Raghundandan asks Rajalakshmi to care for his daughter after his death and Rajalakshmi agrees. She brings Pournami to her home and decides that her son Premjith should marry her. Trouble flourish for both Rajalakshmi and Pournami. Later, Pournami and Prem Shankar became loving each other. But they have been haunted by Anie Punjakkadan, Prem's ex-love of interest. In this time, Rajalakshmi's twin sister Sethulakshmi who was raised by Rajalakshmi's parent's relatives enters Rajalakshmi's house to take revenge on her. But however Sethulakshmi got arrested when she tries to kill Rajalakshmi. After some months Pournami gave birth to a female child named Kingini.

Season-2  
The story takes a two year leap. Prem and Pournami lives happily with her little daughter Kingini. But Anie returns to take revenge on them. Despite having an enemy,  they are facing a new problem that Prem got memory lose. Can Pournami and Prem over come all the crises in their life?

Cast

Main cast 
 Ranjani Raghavan(2019)/Maneesha Jayasingh(2019)/Gowri Krishnan 
(August 2019 – 2021) as Pournami Premjith Shanker Lal(Premsankar's wife, Rajalakshmi and Prathap's daughter in law , Reghunandan's daughter, Kingini's mother)
 Chitra Shenoy (Dual role)
as Rajalakshmi Prathap Shanker Lal(Prem's mother, Prathap's wife, Pournami's mother in law, Vasantham's sister in law, Shwetha's aunt, Kingini's grandmother) 
as Sethulakshmi(Rajalekshmi's twin sister)
 Vishnu V Nair as Premjith Shanker Lal(Pournami's husband, Prathap and Rajalakshmi's son, Shwetha's cousin, Annie's ex-love of interest, Kingini's father)
 Mahesh (2019)/ Lishoy (2020-2021) 
as Prathap Shankar Lal(Prem's father, Pournami's father in law, Rajalakshmi's husband, Vasantham's brother, Shwetha's uncle, Kingini's grandfather)
as Narrator (episode 516)
Vinuja Vijay (2019)/Sneha Diwakar(2020)/ Apsara(2020-2021) as Swetha(Prem's cousin, Vasanthamallika's daughter)
Navami Gayak (2019)/ Lekshmi Pramod (2019-2020) and Lekshmi Priya(2020-2021) as Annie Punjakkadan(Prem's ex-love of interest, Punchakkadan Paulose's daughter)
Baby Annakutty as Kingini(Daughter of Prem and Pournami, granddaughter of Shankar ,Rajalekshmi and Reghunandan)

Recurring cast
 Kanya Bharathi / Devi Chandana as Vasanthamallika(Prathap's sister, Shwetha's mother, Prem's aunt)
Sharan Puthumana (Harishanth) as Nandan(Prem and Annie's friend)
Ravikrishnan Gopalakrishnan as Poulose(Annie's father, Prathap's ex-colleague)
Shemi Martin as Deepa(Pournami and Anand's friend, Prem's colleague)
 Fazil Rihan as Anand(Pournami's childhood friend, Deepa and Prem's colleague and wishes to marry Pournami)
Sini Varghese as Adv.Rani Thomas Kuruvila
Anoop Sivasenan as Adv.Thomas Kuruvila
Munshi Ranjith as Shatrughan a.k.a. Shatru(Sethulakshmi's Step Brother) 
 Jolly Easow as Kanaka(Vasanthamallika's mother, Shwetha's grandma)
 Wafa Aster as Sivaja(Rajalakshmi and Prathap's daughter, Prem's sister, Mohan's wife)
Sai Kumar as Raghunandan(Pournami's father and Rajalakshmi's childhood friend)
 Rishi as Rudran(Pournami's cousin who wished to marry Pournami)
 Cherthala Lalitha as Rudran's mother(Pournami's aunt, Rudran's mother and Raghunandan's sister)
 Faizal as Mohan(Sivaja's husband)
Saritha Balakrishnan as Kingini's care taker 
 Payyanoor Murali
 Gomathi Mahadevan
 Jose Peroorkada
Meera Vasudevan as Sumithra (Cameo)
Krishnakumar Menon as Sidharth (Cameo)
 Sajan Palluruthy as Watchman (Cameo)

Production
The serial remarks the comeback of actress Chitra Shenoy after the serial Sthreedhanam. Popular Kannada serial actress Ranjani Raghavan made her debutante heroine lead role in Malayalam after Kannada TV series Puttugowri Maduve in Colors Kannada, however she quit the show shortly after due to date clashes. Sai Kumar, Malayalam film actor made a cameo role in the first few episodes. Chitra Shenoy carried out the production of the series.

References

2019 Indian television series debuts
Television shows set in Kerala
Malayalam-language television shows
Asianet (TV channel) original programming